This is a list of Estonian television related events from 1992.

Events
 9 May – Eurovision Song Contest 1992 was first time showed in live at Eesti Televisioon. The contest was commented by Ivo Linna and Olavi Pihlamägi.

Debuts

Television shows

Ending this year

Births

Deaths

See also
1992 in Estonia

References

1990s in Estonian television